PB-36 Mastung is a constituency of the Provincial Assembly of Balochistan.

See also
 PB-35 Kalat
 PB-37 Quetta-I

References

External links
 Election commission Pakistan's official website
 Awazoday.com check result
 Balochistan's Assembly official site

Constituencies of Balochistan